The following list is a discography of production by Just Blaze, an American hip hop record producer from Paterson, New Jersey. It includes a list of songs produced, co-produced and remixed by year, artist, album and title.

1999

Harlem World - The Movement
 05. "I Really Like It" (featuring Mase & Kelly Price) (co-produced by Supa Sam & Mase)
 14. "Family Crisis" (co-produced by Supa Sam & Mase)

Buckshot - The BDI Thug
 09. "Heavy Weighters" (featuring Swan & F.T.)

F.T. - New York State of Rhyme
 04. "F-AVA" (featuring AVA)

2000

Beanie Sigel - The Truth
 02. "Who Want What" (featuring Memphis Bleek)

Killah Priest - View From Masada
 02. "View from Masada"
 03. "Hard Times"
 06. "Gotta Eat"

Amil - All Money Is Legal
 05. "Heard It All" (featuring Jay-Z)
 09. "That's Right" (featuring Jay-Z) (co-produced by L.R)

Big Pun - Yeeeah Baby
 03. "Off Wit His Head" (featuring Prospect)
 11. "Wrong Ones" (featuring Sunkiss)

Half-A-Mill - Milíon
 08. "Fires in Hell"
 13. "Thug Luv"

Mad Lion - Predatah or Prey
 03. "Battle Kat Anthem"
 05. "Weed is all we need"
 09. "Rule the World"
 10. "Thrill Ada Hunt"
 13. "Give it to me"
 16. "Go to War"

Busta Rhymes - Anarchy
 06. "Street Shit"
 15. "Here We Go Again" (featuring Flipmode Squad)

Jay-Z - The Dynasty: Roc La Familia
 01. "Intro"
 04. "Streets Is Talking" (featuring Beanie Sigel)
 07. "Stick 2 the Script" (featuring Beanie Sigel)
 13. "The R.O.C." (featuring Beanie Sigel & Memphis Bleek)
 14. "Soon You'll Understand"

Memphis Bleek - The Understanding
 01. "Intro - U Know Bleek"
 04. "We Get Low"
 11. "They'll Never Play Me"

DJ Clue - The Professional 2
 18. "M.A.R.C.Y." (featuring Memphis Bleek & Geda K)

Prodigy - H.N.I.C.
 19. "Diamond" (featuring Bars & Hooks)

2001

Beanie Sigel - The Reason
 02. "Beanie (Mack B**ch)"
 03. "So What You Saying " (featuring Memphis Bleek)
 04. "Get Down"
 12. "Mom Praying" (featuring Scarface)
 13. "Still Got Love For You" (featuring Jay-Z & Rell)
 14. "What Your Life Like 2"

Jadakiss - Kiss tha Game Goodbye
 16. "It's Time I See You" (featuring Cross, Drag-On, Eve, Infa-Red, Sheek, & Styles P)

Jay-Z - The Blueprint
 04. "Girls, Girls, Girls"
 06. "U Don't Know"
 10. "Song Cry"
 14. "Breathe Easy (Lyrical Exercise)" (Bonus Track)

Fabolous - Ghetto Fabolous
 12. "Ma' Be Easy"

DMX - The Great Depression
 13. "I'ma Bang"

Busta Rhymes - Genesis
 02. "Everybody Rise Again"
 07. "We Got What You Want"
 19. "Match the Name With the Voice" (featuring Flipmode Squad)

Tragedy Khadafi - Against all Odds 
 02. "Against all Odds"

2002

State Property - State Property Soundtrack
 01. Roc The Mic - Beanie Sigel & Freeway
 03. It's Not Right - Beanie Sigel, Young Chris & Omillio Sparks
 07. Bitch Niggas - Beanie Sigel & Omillio Sparks
 13. Don't Realize - Beanie Sigel & Rell

Cam'ron - Come Home with Me
 02. "Losing Weight pt. 2" (featuring Juelz Santana)
 03. "Oh Boy" (featuring Juelz Santana)
 07. "Welcome to New York City" (featuring Jay-Z & Juelz Santana)
 13. "The Roc (Just Fire)" (featuring Memphis Bleek & Beanie Sigel)

Beenie Man - Feel It Boy CDS
 "Feel It Boy" (featuring Janet Jackson) (Just Blaze Remix)

Nelly - Nellyville
 13. "Roc the Mic (Remix)" (Beanie Sigel with Freeway featuring Nelly & Murphy Lee)

Various Artist - Like Mike Soundtrack
 06. "Playin' The Game" (featuring Bow Wow)

Trina - Diamond Princess
 11. "How We Do" (featuring Fabolous)

Various Artist - Paid In Full Soundtrack
 06. "Don't You Know" - Jay-Z
 11. "Alright" - Allen Anthony
 13. "I Am Dame Dash" - Dame Dash (featuring Jim Jones & Cam'ron)

Jay-Z - The Blueprint2: The Gift & the Curse
The Gift:
 02. "Hovi Baby"
The Curse:
 03. "U Don't Know (Remix)" (featuring M.O.P.)
 04. "Meet the Parents"
 05. "Some How Some Way" (featuring Beanie Sigel & Scarface)
 10. "As One" (featuring Memphis Bleek, Beanie Sigel, Freeway, Young Gunz, Peedi Crakk, Omillio Sparks, & Rell)
 12. "Show You How" (Bonus Track)
 13. "Bitches & Sisters" (Bonus Track)

Erick Sermon - React
 03. "We Don't Care" (featuring Free)
 05. "React" (featuring Redman)

Snoop Dogg - Paid tha Cost to Be da Boss
 06. "Lollipop" (featuring Jay-Z, Soopafly & Nate Dogg)

Mariah Carey - Charmbracelet
 02. "Boy (I Need You)" (featuring Cam'ron)
 05. "You Got Me" (featuring Freeway & Jay-Z)
 15. "Through The Rain (Remix)" (featuring Joe & Kelly Price)

Mariah Carey - Boy (I Need You) - CDS1
 02. "Boy (I Need You) [Remix]" (featuring Cam'ron, Juelz Santana, Jim Jones & Freeway)

Shaggy - Hey Sexy Lady (Single)
 00. "Hey Sexy Lady (Just Blaze Remix)" (featuring Brian & Tony Gold)

Mario - C'mon (Single)
 01. "C'mon (Just Blaze Remix)"

2003

The Diplomats - Diplomatic Immunity
Disc 2:
 01. "I Really Mean It"
 11. "Built This City"

Freeway - Philadelphia Freeway
 01. "Free"
 02. "What We Do" (featuring Jay-Z & Beanie Sigel)
 04. "Flipside" (featuring Peedi Crakk)
 05. "On My Own" (featuring Nelly)
 06. "We Get Around" (featuring Snoop Dogg)
 07. "Don't Cross The Line" (featuring Faith Evans)
 09. "Full Effect" (featuring Young Gunz)
 13. "Alright" (featuring Allen Anthony)
 15. "You Got Me" (featuring Mariah Carey & Jay-Z) (Bonus Track)
 16. "Line 'Em Up" (featuring Young Chris) (Bonus Track)

Fabolous - Street Dreams
 05. "Can't Let You Go" (featuring Lil' Mo & Mike Shorey)

Just Blaze - NBA Live 2003 OST
 05. "Let's Go (featuring Freeway & Memphis Bleek)

Flipmode Squad - NBA Live 2003 OST
 12. "Here We Go"

Joe Budden - Joe Budden
 03. "Pump It Up"
 09. "Fire" (featuring Busta Rhymes)
 13. "Give Me a Reason"

Fabolous - More Street Dreams 2: The Mixtape 
 09. Fire (featuring Joe Budden & Paul Cain)
 14. Can't Let You Go (Remix)

Jay-Z - The Black Album
 01. "Interlude"
 02. "December 4th"
 10. "Public Service Announcement (Interlude)"

Keith Murray - He's Keith Murray
 04. "Yeah Yeah U Know It" (featuring Erick Sermon & Redman)

Nick Cannon - Nick Cannon
 01. "Get Crunk Shorty" (featuring Ying Yang Twins & Fatman Scoop)

"Love Don't Cost a Thing" Original Soundtrack
 01. "Shorty (Put It on the Floor)" (Busta Rhymes, Chingy, Fat Joe & Nick Cannon)

Memphis Bleek - M.A.D.E.
 02. "Everythings a Go" (featuring Jay-Z)
 03. "Round Here" (featuring Trick Daddy & T.I.)
 04. "Just Blaze, Bleek & Free" (featuring Freeway)
 06. "Hypnotic" (featuring Jay-Z & Beanie Sigel)
 08. "War"
 12. "Hell No"
 17. "R.O.C."

2004

Carl Thomas - Let's Talk About It
 03. "My First Love"

Young Gunz - Tough Luv
 04. "Friday Night"
 07. "Tough Luv" (featuring Denim)

Janet Jackson
 00. "Love Me" (Just Blaze Remix) (Alternate version of "Just a Little While")
 00. "Love Me" (Just Blaze Remix featuring Naledge)

Shyne - Godfather Buried Alive
 "Here with Me"
 "Diamonds & Mac 10's"

Usher - Confessions
 03. "Throwback"

Shawnna - Worth tha Weight
 02. "Let's Go"

Talib Kweli - The Beautiful Struggle
  12. "Never Been In Love"

Jon B - Stronger Everyday
 01. "Everytime" (featuring Dirt McGirt)
 16. "Everytime (Remix)" (featuring Beenie Man & Farena)

Jin - The Rest Is History
 04. "Club Song"

Ying Yang Twins - My Brother & Me Bonus DVD
 07. "Get Crunk Shorty" (featuring Nick Cannon & Fatman Scoop)

Rah Digga - Everything Is a Story (Unreleased)
 08. "Party and Bullshit 2003"
 10. "Street People" (featuring Young Zee & Joe Budden)
 20. "Party and Bullshit 2003 (Remix)" (featuring The Notorious B.I.G.) [Bonus Track]
 21. "Party and Bullshit 2003 (Remix)" (featuring Missy Elliott & Eve) [Bonus Track]

Fabolous - Real Talk
 12. "It's All Right" (featuring Sean Paul)
 13. "Breathe"

Memphis Bleek
 00. "Yes" (featuring Jay-Z)

Lenny Kravitz
 00. "Storm [Just Blaze Remix]" (featuring Jay-Z)

2005

Fat Joe - All or Nothing
 03. "Safe 2 Say (The Incredible)"

The Game - The Documentary
 08. "Church for Thugs"
 13. "No More Fun and Games"

Beanie Sigel - The B. Coming
 09. "Bread and Butter" (featuring Sadat X & Grand Puba)

Memphis Bleek - 534
 01. "534"
 02. "Interlude"
 03. "Dear Summer" (featuring Jay-Z)
 14. "Straight Path"

M.E.D. - Push Comes to Shove
 15. "Get Back"

Kanye West - Late Registration
 03. "Touch the Sky" (featuring Lupe Fiasco)

Busta Rhymes - The Big Bang
 00. "Get Flat" (featuring Butch Cassidy) (Leftover track)

Notorious B.I.G. - Duets: The Final Chapter
 10. "Livin' In Pain" (featuring Mary J. Blige, 2Pac & Nas)

2006

LeToya - LeToya
 02. "U Got What I Need"

Ghostface Killah - Fishscale
 04. "The Champ"

Cory Gunz
 "I Gotcha" (featuring Lil Wayne)

T.I. - King
 01. "King Back"
 04. "I'm Talkin' to You"

Governor - Son of Pain
 08. "You Got The Power" (featuring T.I.)

Rhymefest - Blue Collar
 02. "Dynomite (Going Postal)"

Diddy - Press Play
 07. "Tell Me" (featuring Christina Aguilera)

The Game - Doctor's Advocate
 05. "Remedy"
 16. "Why You Hate The Game" (featuring Nas & Marsha Ambrosius)

Jay-Z - Kingdom Come
 02. "Oh My God"
 03. "Kingdom Come"
 04. "Show Me What You Got"

Freeway - The Hood News Reloaded (The Remix Edition) (Cutmaster C mixtape)
 08. "Flipside (Part 2)" (featuring Peedi Crakk)

Capone - Menace 2 Society
 03. "Troublesome (La, La, La)" (featuring Noreaga)

Teriyaki Boyz - "Beef or Chicken"
 09. "今夜はバギーパンツ" [Kon-ya wa Baggy Pants] (Tonight is Baggy Pants)"

2007

Juelz Santana - Nike
 00. "The Second Coming" (featuring Just Blaze)

Daddy Yankee - El Cartel: The Big Boss
 12. "Papi Lover" (featuring Nicole Scherzinger) (co-produced with Echo & Diesel)

Fabolous - From Nothin' to Somethin'
 06. "Return of the Hustle" (featuring Swizz Beatz)

T.I. - T.I. vs T.I.P.
 01. "Act I (T.I.P.)" (co-produced with T.I. & Caviar)
 08. "Act II (T.I.)" (co-produced with T.I. & Caviar)
 09. "Help Is Coming"
 15. "Act III (T.I. vs T.I.P.)" (co-produced with T.I. & Caviar)

Talib Kweli - Eardrum
 03. "Hostile Gospel Pt. 1 (Deliver Us)"

Jay-Z - American Gangster
 10. "Ignorant Shit" (featuring Beanie Sigel)
 15. "American Gangster" (Bonus Track)

2008

Common - Smirnoff Signature Mix Series 12"
A2. "The Light '08 (Radio Edit)" (featuring Marsha Ambrosius)

Rakim - The Archive: Live, Lost & Found
 04. "It's Nothing"

The Game - L.A.X.
 00. "Superman" (Leftover track)

T.I. - Paper Trail
 05. "Live Your Life" (featuring Rihanna)

Jay Electronica - Fresh Cuts Vol. 3 (Music By Guitar Center Employees) (Guitar Center compilation)
 00. "Exhibit A (Transformations)"

Maroon 5 - Call and Response: The Remix Album
 04. "Makes Me Wonder (Just Blaze Remix)"

Jamie Foxx - Intuition
 03. "Number One" (featuring Lil Wayne)

2009

Maino - If Tomorrow Comes (June 30, 2009)
 07. "All the Above" (featuring T-Pain) (co-produced with Nard & B)

Fabolous - Loso's Way (July 28, 2009)
 14. "Lullaby" (Produced by The Alchemist, scratches by Just Blaze)

Skyzoo - The Salvation (September 29, 2009)
 02. "Return Of The Real"

Saigon - Warning Shots 2
13. "Who Can Get Busy" (featuring Grand Puba)
15. "Gotta Believe It" (featuring Just Blaze)

Sha Stimuli - My Soul To Keep (October 27, 2009)
 06. "Move Back" (featuring Freeway)

2010

Trey Songz - Non-album track
"For The Sake of Love"

Eminem - Recovery
01. "Cold Wind Blows"
09. "No Love" (featuring Lil' Wayne)
16. "You're Never Over"
19. "Session One" (featuring Slaughterhouse) (iTunes Bonus Track)
00. "Fly Away (featuring Just Blaze) (Leftover track)

Capone-N-Noreaga - The War Report 2: Report the War
00. "T.O.N.Y Pt. 2" (Unreleased)

Fat Joe - The Darkside Vol. 1
03. "I Am Crack"

Game - The Red Room
14. "Maad Maxx Freestyle"
00. "400 Bars" (featuring DJ Drama)

Joe Budden - Mood Muzik 4: A Turn 4 The Worst
16. "Stuck In The Moment"

MosEL - Just Thinking Out Loud 
 4. "Vent" (prod. by Just Blaze & Flying Lotus)

2011

Saigon - The Greatest Story Never Told
01. "Station Identification (Intro)" (featuring Fatman Scoop)
02. "The Invitation" (featuring Q-Tip & Fatman Scoop)
03. "C'mon Baby (Remix)" (featuring Swizz Beatz & Jay-Z)
04. "War"
05. "Bring Me Down, Part 2"
06. "Enemies" (Additional production)
07. "Friends"
08. "The Greatest Story Never Told"
09. "Clap" (featuring Faith Evans)
10. "Preacher" (featuring Lee Fields & The Expressions)
12. "Believe It"
13. "Give It To Me" (featuring Raheem DeVaughn) (Additional production)
14. "What The Lovers Do" (featuring Devin The Dude) (Additional production)
15. "Better Way" (featuring Layzie Bone)
16. "Oh Yeah (Our Babies)" (Additional production)
17. "And The Winner Is..." (featuring Bun B)

Joell Ortiz - Free Agent
07. "Battle Cry" (co-produced by Audible Doctor)

Marsha Ambrosius - Late Nights & Early Mornings
05. "Far Away"

Mac Miller - Best Day Ever
08. "All Around The World"

XV - Zero Heroes
01. "Wichita"

Maybach Music Group - Self Made Vol. 1
01. "Self Made"

Rick Ross
00. "I Love My Bitches"

Drake - Take Care 
 10. "Lord Knows" (featuring Rick Ross)

2012

Game - California Republic
02. "Red Bottom Boss" (featuring Rick Ross)

T.I. - Fuck Da City Up
17. "Oh Yeah" (featuring Trey Songz)

OnCue
00. "New Religion" (co-produced by Party Supplies)

Kendrick Lamar - good kid, m.A.A.d city
12. "Compton" (featuring Dr. Dre)

Saigon - The Greatest Story Never Told Chapter 2: Bread And Circuses
01. "Plant the Seed (What U Paid For)" (Additional production)
02. "Rap vs. Real"

Freeway - Diamond In the Ruff
07. "Early"

Captain Murphy - "Duality"
04. "The Ritual"

Jon Connor - The People's Rapper LP
01. "Cold Wind Blows"
18. "No Love"

Madonna - "MDNA (Nightlife Edition)"
09. "Give Me All Your Luvin' (Just Blaze Bionic Dub)"

2013

Wale - The Gifted
14. "88" (produced with Tone P)

Tony Touch - The Piece Maker 3: Return of the 50 MCs
22. "Slaughter Session" (featuring Joell Ortiz, Royce da 5'9" & Crooked I)

Just Blaze and Baauer
00. "Higher" (featuring Jay-Z)

Slaughterhouse
00. "Party" (co-produced by Cardiak)

2014

Various Artists - Shady XV
 02. "Psychopath Killer" (featuring Slaughterhouse, Eminem, & Yelawolf) (co-produced by Boi-1da)

OnCue - Angry Young Man
 02. "Don't Forget Your Coat" (co-produced by CJ Luzi)
 03. "So Much Love" (co-produced by Hudson Mohawke)
 05. "Running" (co-produced by CJ Luzi)
 06. "No Way" (co-produced by Maki, Brenton Duvall & Royal)
 08. "Every Last Dollar" (co-produced by Terence Ryan)
 09. "Way Too Far" (co-produced by Maki & Frequency)
 11. "A Rolling Stone" (co-produced by manicanparty)
 12. "This View From Here" (co-produced by Maki & Nicky Finest)

2015

Ludacris - Ludaversal
 14. "This Has Been My World"

Various Artists - Southpaw (Music from and Inspired By the Motion Picture)
 07. "R.N.S." - Slaughterhouse (produced with AraabMuzik)

Run The Jewels - Meow The Jewels
 02. "OH MY DARLING DON'T MEOW" (remix)

Jadakiss - Top 5 Dead or Alive
 09. "Synergy" (featuring Styles P)

2016

Beyoncé - Lemonade
 10. "Freedom" (featuring Kendrick Lamar) (produced with Jonny Coffer & Beyoncé)

Snoop Dogg - Coolaid
 04. "Super Crip"
 20. "Revolution" (featuring October London)

Termanology - More Politics
 01. "Just Politics"

2017

Hall N' Nash (Westside Gunn & Conway)
 00. "MachineGun Black"

Faith Evans & The Notorious B.I.G. - The King & I
 08. "The Reason"
 20. "Take Me There" (featuring Sheek Louch & Styles P)

Eminem - Revival
 09. "Like Home" (featuring Alicia Keys)

Sha Stimuli 
 "New Jordan’s"

2018

Various Artists - Rapture (Music from the Netflix Original TV Series) - EP
 01. "Let Me Work" - G-Eazy

T.I. - Dime Trap
 02. "Laugh at Em" (co-produced by Cardiak)

Cam'ron - The Program
 14. "Kiss Myself"

2019

Various Artists - The Lion King: The Gift
 12. "Mood 4 Eva" - Beyoncé, Jay-Z & Childish Gambino (produced with Beyoncé, DJ Khaled & Danja)

Rick Ross - Port of Miami 2
 06. "Big Tyme" (featuring Swizz Beatz)

2020

Westside Gunn - Who Made the Sunshine
 11. "98 Sabers" (featuring Armani Caesar, Conway The Machine and Benny The Butcher)

2021

Vic Mensa - I TAPE
 2. "VICTORY" (featuring DJ Pharris)

Various Artists - Space Jam: A New Legacy
 1. "We Win" - Lil Baby & Kirk Franklin

2022

T.I. - Kill the King
 00. TBA (featuring Nas, Jay-Z, Ludacris)
 00. TBA

Unsorted
The 701 Squad
 "Black Mask (We're Taking It All)"

Angie Martinez
 "Take You Home (Just Blaze Remix)" (featuring Fabolous & Kelis)

Beanie Sigel
 "Get Down (Remix)" (featuring Freeway, Clinton Sparks & Young Gunz)

Beastie Boys
 "Ch-Check It Out (Just Blaze Remix)"

Beenie Man
 "Feel It Boy" (featuring Janet Jackson) (Just Blaze Remix)

Bow Wow
 "Play The Game"

Capone-N-Noreaga
 "My Alias"

Chingy
 "I Must Be Dreaming (featuring JoJo)

Chris Brown
 "Real Throwback" (featuring Fabolous)

Cory Gunz
 "I Gotcha" (featuring Lil Wayne)

Diddy
 "Get Off"

DJ Drama
 "Million Dollar Baby" (featuring Lil Wayne)

DJ Green Lantern
 "Impeach The President" (featuring Dead Prez, Immortal Technique & Saigon)

Edison Chen
 "Act Like You Know"

Erick Sermon
 "Guns Out In A Circle"

Eve
 "Let Go (Hit The Dance Floor)" (featuring Jadakiss)

Faith Evans
 "Burnin' Up (Just Burnin' Remix)" featuring Diddy & Freeway

Foxy Brown
"Art of War"

Freck Billionaire
 "Break You Off (featuring Fabolous)
 "In The Streets"

Freeway
 "Shootout"
 "Flipside pt. 2" (featuring Peedi Crakk)

Funkmaster Flex
 "We Are" (featuring Memphis Bleek & Geda K)

Janet Jackson
 "Love Me" (Just Blaze Remix) (Alternate version of "Just a Little While")
 "Love Me" (Just Blaze Remix featuring Naledge)

Jay Electronica
 "Exhibit A (Transformation)"
 "Exhibit C"

Jay-Z
 "Flow"
 "99 Problems (Just Blaze Remix)"
 "Moment of Clarity (Just Blaze Remix)"
 "Allure (Just Blaze Remix)"
 "Warm It Up Jay Freestyle"
 "Public Service Announcement (Part 2)"
 "Ignorant Shit (Original Version)"
 "Reminder (Just Blaze Remix)"

Joe Budden
 "Pop Off"
 "Fuel"

Kanye West
 "Touch The Sky (Remix)" (featuring D-Block)
 "Overrreact" (featuring Consequence)
 "What Else" (featuring AZ)

Kid Cudi
 "Not I Alone" (featuring Snoop Dogg)

Killah Priest
 "Fall Of Solomon"
 "Last Supper"

Lenny Kravitz
 "Storm (Just Blaze RMX) (featuring Jay-Z)

Lil Wayne
 "Million Dollar Baby"

Mario
 "C'mon (Just Blaze Remix)"

MF Doom
 "Kookies (Just Blaze Remix)"

Mos Def
 "Holiday"

Naledge
 "My Country" (featuring Cornel West & Assata Shakur)

Nas
 "The Scientist (featuring Jay-Z)"

Nat King Cole
 "Pick Up"

N.O.R.E.
 Niggarican (featuring Peedi Crakk)

Rhymefest
 "Touch & Go"

Royce da 5'9"
 "What We Do"
 "King of Detroit" - Build & Destroy

S-Word
 "World Summit"

Shaggy
 "Hey Sexy Lady (Put It On Me Just Blaze Remix)" (featuring Brian & Tony Gold)

Swizz Beatz
 "Ride Or Die" (featuring Fabolous)

T.I.
 "You Ain't Fly"
 "All Night"

Teriyaki Boyz
 "Baggy Pants"

The Game
 "Undefeated" (featuring Busta Rhymes & Marsha Ambrosius)
 "Beat 'Em Up"
 "I'll Find You"
 "Superman"
 "Fall Back" (featuring Freeway & City Boy of AZ Boys)

Twista
 "Ass Whoop" (featuring Saigon)

Tragedy Khadafi
 "Against All Odds"

Usher
 "Throwback (Remix)" (featuring Jadakiss)

Xzibit 
 "Multiply (Remix)" (featuring Busta Rhymes)

Soundtracks

 "NBA Street Vol. 2" by EA Sports BIG
 "Tiger Woods PGA Tour 2004" by EA Sports
 "NBA Ballers: Chosen One" by Midway Games

References

Production discographies
 
 
Discographies of American artists
Hip hop discographies

de:Just Blaze#Produktionen (Auswahl)
fr:Just Blaze#Liste des productions
fi:Just Blaze#Just Blazen tuottamia kappaleita